William Botterill and Son was a prominent Kingston upon Hull architectural practice.

The practice was founded by William Botterill (1820–1903), who worked with his son William Henry Botterill (1851–79), and after 1881 with John Bilson (1858–1943) as Botterill and Bilson.

History
William Botterill came to Hull in 1848 as clerk of works for the new Royal Station Hotel and set up an architectural practice in 1851. His son William Henry (1851–79) was also a partner in his practice. John Bilson, trained at the practice and became a partner in 1881. Botterill's son William Henry died early in 1879 and Bilson subsequently became the main partner in the practice, taking over the business when Botterill retired in 1899.

The firm's commissions included chapels, houses, banks, offices, industrial buildings: commissions included the schools for the Hull School Board, with Botterill initially producing gothic revival designs, and later designs in the Queen Anne revival style by Bilson. Botterill designed the Newland Park Estate in Hull in 1877, though most of its houses were developed after his death. Oriel Chambers (now the home of the Wilberforce Institute for the study of Slavery and Emancipation) were built in 1879. Bilson's work included the Jacobean style Hymers College (1893), the Boulevard Higher Grade School (1895), and classically styled buildings for the Hull Savings Bank built in the 1920s and after.

Listed and other buildings, non-exhaustive list

William Botterill
Stepney Station House, Hull (1853).
Centenary Methodist Chapel (1863).
Methodist Chapel and Sunday School, Alford, Lincolnshire. (1864).
Exchange Buildings, Lowgate, Hull (1866).
32, Silver Street, Hull (1869–70).
Offices. 2, Manor Street, Hull (1870).
Kings Market, South Church Side, Market Place, Hull (1875).
Oriel Chambers, Hull (1879).
Charterhouse School, Hull (1881).
Newington Primary School (1885) and adjoining nursery (1898), Hull.
Stepney Infants School, Hull (1886).

John Bilson
Church of All Saints, Bolton Percy, North Yorkshire. (originally 14th century, restored 1905 by Bilson)
Pickering Hall, Hull (1914)
Lloyds Bank, Silver Street, Hull (1912).
Church of St. Helen, Escrick (orig. 1857, restored 1923 by Bilson).

Demolished works
 ; red brick early English gothic revival (built 1881–2)
 ; Weslyan chapel, white brick and stone, neoclassical (built 1873, dem.2004)

See also
Cuthbert Brodrick, Alfred Gelder, contemporary Hull architects

Notes

References

Sources

External links

Architecture firms based in Kingston upon Hull